Coumba Ndoffène Diouf  (born 29 December 1932 in Diakhao) is a Senegalese politician. He served as Foreign Minister of Senegal from 1972–73.

References
Babacar Ndiaye et Waly Ndiaye, Présidents et ministres de la République du Sénégal, Dakar, 2006 (2e éd.),

1932 births
Living people
Foreign ministers of Senegal
Health ministers of Senegal
Labour ministers of Senegal
Serer politicians
People from Fatick Region
20th-century Senegalese politicians